The Opelousas Historic District, in Opelousas in St. Landry Parish, Louisiana is a historic district which was listed on the National Register of Historic Places in 1989.

The district's "anchor is the courthouse square with its huge live oak trees and 1939 Art Deco courthouse. On the northwest corner is the neo-classical Old Opelousas City Hall."  It includes the courthouse square, the row of buildings facing the square on its east side (on S. Court Street), the row of buildings facing on its south side (on W. Landry St., which is also the one-way west-bound Ronald Reagan Highway / United States Route 190) and one more row of buildings going east on the south side of E. Landry St. not facing the square.

This area includes 18 contributing buildings and only three buildings regarded as intrusions, which are deemed non-contributing.  But the defined district then "is only a small portion of what is regarded as historic downtown Opelousas. The other two sides of the courthouse square have too many intrusions and/or badly altered historic buildings, as does the remainder of the central business district."

Google Streetview imagery captured March 2022 shows that building number 9 on E. Landry St. in the documents, perhaps 129 E. Landry, showing in accompanying photo 3, is gone, replaced now by garden landscaping behind an iron fence, with parking beyond.  Murals now on building sides facing this lot.

Location: Roughly bounded by Bellevue, Court St., Landry St., and Market St.
Architecture: Classical Revival, Greek Revival, Italianate

Its  area includes 18 contributing buildings, dating from c.1840 to 1939.  These include two which were already separately listed on the National Register:  the Old Federal Building (Opelousas, Louisiana) and the Opelousas City Hall.

Historic function: Government; Commerce/trade
Historic subfunction: Courthouse; Post Office; City Hall
Criteria: architecture/engineering

Landry St. buildings have been renumbered since the 1989 NRHP listing. E.g. Greek Revival law office, now 129 W. Landry, was identified as 153 W. Landry in NRHP document.

Opelousas Downtown National Historic District, listed on the National Register of Historic Places in 1989, has boundaries which encompass the courthouse square, buildings on two sides of the square, and an adjacent row of party wall buildings immediately to the east, in Opelousas, Louisiana.  Most of the contributing elements are historic commercial buildings and the two oldest are known to have been used as law offices.  The eighteen contributing historic buildings range in date from c. 1840 to 1939.  Located in the heart of the community, the National Historic District is only a small portion of what is regarded as the historic downtown and is distinguished by the range of styles represented and the landmark quality of the building.  Styles range from Greek Revival, Romanesque Revival, Italianate, neo-classical, and Art Deco.

Architecture and significance

The Opelousas National Historic District is locally significant in the area of architecture because it is easily the best preserved historic central business district in St. Landry Parish in Louisiana.  The following are the eighteen contributing elements to the district:

1. St. Landry Parish Courthouse (1939), centerpiece of Courthouse Square. Three-story limestone faced Art Deco building has an above-ground basement and a sleek brushed aluminum spiral staircase on the interior.

compare to: "St. Landry Parish Courthouse (1939). Contributing element. Three story
limestone faced Art Deco courthouse with an above-ground basement. Features
a dramatic central projecting pavilion with sets of broad superimposed
shafts culminating in a central parapet. Rising above the roofline, the
pavilion is a strikingly vertical element in an otherwise horizontal
building. Other noteworthy features include proletarian relief
ornamentation, the original Art Deco lamp standards flanking the steps, and
a sleek brushed aluminum spiral staircase on the interior."

2. Old Opelousas City Hall:  Individually listed on the National Register of Historic Places, this was originally an 1888 Victorian marketplace, but completely remodeled in 1932 in the neo-classical style for use as the City Hall.  It is located on the Courthouse Square, at its northeast corner (S. Market St. & W. Bellevue St.)

Compare to: "Originally an 1888 Victorian marketplace, but completely remodeled in 1932
in the neo-classical style. Single story, five bay, stucco over brick
building located in the northwestern corner of the courthouse square.
Noteworthy features include an aedicule style entranceway with a parapet
and free-standing Ionic columns of artificial granite, large lunette
windows, and pilasters marking the bays. [in 1989] The building is deteriorated, with
much of the stucco lost."

3. Union Bank and Trust (c.1910), facing the courthouse square across S. Court St., at the corner of E. Bellevue. This grand one story stucco and terra cotta neo-classical building has some outstanding architectural features.  Its doorways facing onto both streets are sided by engaged fluted Ionic columns flanked by wide pilasters and topped by pediments outlined with heavy dentils and accented with a bas relief pelican at the center.  The building is the northernmost building in the district. on the corner of S. Court and E. Bellevue streets. (See 1989 photo, first of 10 accompanying NRHP document).

Pelican? Appears to be an eagle in each of the two pediments.  What shows in Google Streetview is unchanged vs. 1989 photo.

IMHO too closely paraphrased vs. NRHP document text:
"Grand one story stucco and terra cotta neo-classical
corner bank fully articulated on two elevations. The slightly projecting
entrance pavilion on each elevation features engaged fluted Ionic columns
flanked by wide pilasters and a pediment outlined with heavy dentils
and accented with a bas relief pelican at the center. Other noteworthy
elements include a bold entablature, decorative strips with triglyphs and
geometric shapes, and huge arched openings with keystones. Above the
entablature is a parapet and above that a curvilinear Baroque style roof.
The only exterior alteration has been the construction of an elevated
walkway on the side elevation. Although the walkway abuts the pavilion, it
has not damaged it and does not obscure the all important three-quarter
view of the building."

4a. 122 Court Street Building:  Built around 1930, this one story commercial vernacular building has a fixed awning, a brick cornice and thin bands of contrasting decorative tile framing the storefront.

4b.  New Drug Store Building:  Located on Court Street and built around 1905, this two story building has fairly elaborate brickwork and some of the original shop front.

5.  Old Federal Building (1890), S. Court St. at corner with E. Landry St.:  Individually listed on the National Register of Historic Places, this building was constructed in 1890 and remodeled in 1932.   The large two and three story Romanesque Revival building was originally a combination U.S. Courthouse/Post Office.

6.  Dietlein/Savoy Building:  Located at 133 East Landry Street, this one story brick building, built in 1894, features decorative bands of cast Fleur-de-lis.  The building, used as Savoy's Barber Shop for many years, was originally Dietlein Jewelry Store.  See story below from the St. Landry Clarion
"Our popular young fellow-townsman, Mr. Frank J. Dietlein, has opened a neat and well-appointed watch and jewelry store and repair establishment in the new building on Landry Street, recently erected for him, where he will be pleased to serve the public in his line.  Mr. Dietlein is a skilled workman, having learned his business in some of the best establishments of the great West, spending a number of years acquiring a through knowledge of the most complicated details of the jeweler’s and watch repairer’s trade.  We can commend him to the public as a reliable, competent and conscientious workman."

"Mr. Frank Dietlein has an elegant cabinet in his jewelry store, equal in every respect to the fine factory made furniture of the north. It is the handwork of our townsman Mr. T. G. Chachere, and reflects credit upon his ingenuity and ability as an artisan."
 Includes photo of the Dietlein building with Dietlein's store and a barbershop, in early 1900s.

7.  129 East Landry Street:  Built in 1905, this one story brick building has ornamental pressed metal cornice topped by two short decorative projections.

8.  123 East Landry Street:  Built in 1930, this building features decorative parapet with a pediment shaped central portion.

9. & 10.  Jacobs’ Building - 113-115 East Landry Street:  Both of these one-story brick buildings were built in 1916-17 by Aaron Jacobs.  One of the buildings was used as Jacobs News Depot, the other was rented by Mr. Jacobs for various other businesses through the years.  During the 1950s the buildings housed the Singer Sewing Center and Ladco Drugs.  They both have relatively elaborate detailing and retain their historic fixed awnings.  The following story from the front page of the St. Landry Clarion on Saturday, July 15, 1916 tells the story of these two buildings:

NEW BRICK BUILDING TO GRACE LANDRY ST. 
Jacobs News Plans Erection of Modern Up-to-Date Home 
THURSTON McKINNEY SECURES CONTRACT FOR NEWEST STORE 
Building Between Shute’s Drug Store and Veazie Building to Cost Upwards of $6,000.

A new modern up-to-date brick building will soon grace Landry Street, the principal city thoroughfare.  Jacobs News Depot Company recently let out a contract to Thurston McKinney, local contractor, for the erection of a single story brick building on its lots between Shute’s Drug store and the Veazie Building. Work on the building, which will cost upwards of $6,000 will be started just as soon as material arrives.  The Nolan Arcade and the building occupied by White, The Tailor, will be demolished right away."

Aaron Jacobs, progressive and thrifty manager of the Jacobs News Depot Company, for sometime past has been figuring on erecting a building  on the valuable lot owned by his company and was fully decided to keep abreast of the times. The new building on Landry Street will make the, south side of East Landry more citified than ever; there will be only three old buildings on the block and it is expected that those will in the near future be torn down to be replaced with modern and up-to-date buildings."

Jacobs announced during the week that he would divide his building into two stores, one portion will be occupied by the company and the other has already been leased for the next five years to parties, whose identity Mr. Jacobs would not reveal."

11.  Shute's Building:  Built in 1924, this two story brick building located on the corner of Court and Landry streets, has cast cement trim accenting the windows.  This building replaced an earlier drug store building that stood on that same lot for many years during the late 1800s to early 1900s.

12.  Parish Bank & Trust Company/Casanova Building (c.1920), 101 W. Landry St.:  Built as the Parish Bank and Trust Company, this two story tapestry brick corner building facing W. Landrey St. (with the courthouse square beyond), has a bas relief eagle at the top center of the building, flanked by two panels with stylized fretwork, and it has diamond patterns over two of its windows on the Court St. side of the building.  At one time, this building was the Office of the Sheriff and Tax Collector of St. Landry Parish as well as Owen's Office Supply.  Later it housed the office for Casanova Insurance.  In 2014, and still in 2022, its first floor is the Java Square Café. (Shown in 1989 in last of 10 photos accompanying NRHP document).

13. Sandoz Building, now 113-117 W. Landry:  Built during the 1890s, this large two story Italianate stucco over brick building has segmentally arched windows on the side and upper story of the façade.  The building was used for various purposed through they years.  At one time it served as a hotel.  At the turn of the twentieth century this was Landau's Store, in 1906 it housed Jacobs News Depot and Lemelle's Restaurant.  During the 1950s, this building was Seiler's Western Store.  In the 1990s this became the office for Sandoz, Sandoz and Schiff Law Firm. In 2014, it was the office of William Simmons Sandoz, Attorney-at-Law.

14.  Stander Building:  Built about 1930, this one story commercial vernacular building is located at 139/141 West Landry Street.

15.  Greco Building:  This 1930 one story brick commercial vernacular building is located at 145 West Landry Street.  Formerly the Greco Shoe Shop, it is now Back In Time, an old time diner, coffee and gift shop.

16.  19th Century Law Office (c.1845), 129 W. Landry (was numbered 153 West Landry St.)  This Greek Revival law office was built around 1845.

17.  Homer Mouton Law Office (c.1840), 163 W. Landry St.  Built around 1840, this one story brick law office is located at 163 West Landry Street.  It is the oldest building in the Opelousas National Historic District.

Only three buildings in the district were deemed non-contributing intrusions:
building on Court Street, c.1950. "Two story nondescript commercial building. (Although it is two stories, it is the same height
as the contributing one story buildings.)"
"Palace Cafe, 139 W. Landry St., at corner of S. Market, the easternmost building in the district.  Described simply as "1950s one story brick cafe", it was less than 50 years old at time of 1989 NRHP listing. This one would likely be eligible to be deemed contributing now, although it has not been formally redesignated as that.
building on W. Landry Street. "One story, low scale modern brick commercial building."

Gallery

Gibbs Corner, the northeast corner of Court & Bellevue, is just across Bellevue from the district.

References

External links

For additional information on Opelousas visit the website www.opelousastales.com

Historic districts on the National Register of Historic Places in Louisiana
National Register of Historic Places in St. Landry Parish, Louisiana